Pei Di was a Chinese poet of the Tang dynasty, approximate year of birth 714, with one work included in the popular Three Hundred Tang Poems. Pei Di was a contemporary of Wang Wei, although younger by fifteen years. Pei Di has twenty preserved poems in the Wangchuan ji poetry collection, which collects twenty matching poems by Wang Wei and Pei Di. The poet's name is also rendered into English as "P'ei Ti" or "Pei Shidi" (shi = 十). The close personal friendship between Wang Wei and Pei Di is preserved in a letter by Wang Wei inviting Pei for a Springtime visit together at Wang's country estate. This letter has been translated by Arthur Waley. Pei also had a poetic relationship with Du Fu. Other than through Pei Di's few surviving poems, and the poems addressed to him by Wang Wei and Du Fu, "pitifully little" is known about Pei Di, other than that he had a reasonably successful government career.

Poems
One of Pei Di's poems, translated by Witter Bynner as "A Farewell to Cui", a farewell poem dedicated to a friend named Cui, was included in the important collection Three Hundred Tang Poems, as exemplary of the five-character (line length) version of the quatrain style known as juéjù, or "cut verse". Pei Di is also famous for his collaboration with Wang Wei: this series of poems (the Wangchuan ji) has been translated into English as "The Wang River Collection", or similarly. Consisting of twenty preserved titles, for each title Wang Wei wrote a pair of couplets loosely inspired by landscape features around his country estate. These were then matched by a pair of couplets on the same theme by Pei Di. These and a few other poems by Pei Di are preserved in Scroll 129 of the Quantangshi.

Wang Wei's letter to Pei Di
A letter from Wang Wei to his friend Pei Di (here transliterated P'ei Ti) is preserved, and has been translated by Arthur Waley:

PROSE LETTER

_To the Bachelor-of-Arts P`ei Ti_

Of late during the sacrificial month, the weather has been calm and
clear, and I might easily have crossed the mountain. But I knew that you
were conning the classics and did not dare disturb you. So I roamed
about the mountain-side, rested at the Kan-p`ei Temple, dined with the
mountain priests, and, after dinner, came home again. Going northwards,
I crossed the Yuuan-pa, over whose waters the unclouded moon shone with
dazzling rim. When night was far advanced, I mounted Hua-tzuu's Hill and
saw the moonlight tossed up and thrown down by the jostling waves of
Wang River. On the wintry mountain distant lights twinkled and vanished;
in some deep lane beyond the forest a dog barked at the cold, with a cry
as fierce as a wolf's. The sound of villagers grinding their corn at
night filled the gaps between the slow chiming of a distant bell.

Now I am sitting alone. I listen, but cannot hear my grooms and servants
move or speak. I think much of old days: how hand in hand, composing
poems as we went, we walked down twisting paths to the banks of clear
streams.

We must wait for Spring to come: till the grasses sprout and the trees
bloom. Then wandering together in the spring hills we shall see the
trout leap lightly from the stream, the white gulls stretch their wings,
the dew fall on the green moss. And in the morning we shall hear the cry
of curlews in the barley-fields.

It is not long to wait. Shall you be with me then? Did I not know the
natural subtlety of your intelligence, I would not dare address to you
so remote an invitation. You will understand that a deep feeling
dictates this course.

Written without disrespect by Wang Wei, a dweller in the mountains.

Legacy
Pei Di's influence on posterity mainly derives from his contributions to the Wangchuan Ji anthology, consisting of 20 of his poems written as responsive matches to 20 of Wang Wei's. The series has inspired various subsequent works, including translations into English by Jerome Ch'en and Michael Bullock  and by H. C. Chang. Also, many centuries later, Pei Di's poem in the 300 Tang Poems remains as one of the more reprinted poems.

See also

Chinese poetry
Classical Chinese poetry
Fields and Gardens poetry
Jueju
List of Chinese language poets
Shi (poetry)
Tang poetry
Wang Wei (Tang dynasty)
Wangchuan ji

Notes

References
Chang, H. C. (1977). Chinese Literature 2: Nature Poetry. New York: Columbia University Press. 
Ch'en, Jerome and Michael Bullock (1960). Poems of Solitude. London: Abelard-Schuman. 
Stimson, Hugh M. (1976). Fifty-five T'ang Poems. Far Eastern Publications: Yale University. 
Wu, John C. H. (1972). The Four Seasons of Tang Poetry. Rutland, Vermont: Charles E. Tuttle.

External links

 http://wengu.tartarie.com/wg/wengu.php?lang=en&l=Tangshi&no=229 Pei Di poem in Tang 300
 http://scrolls.uchicago.edu/view.php?env=STD_PUB&_scroll_id=2&lang=default University of Chicago, includes stone rubbing
 

714 births
8th-century Chinese poets
Three Hundred Tang Poems poets
Year of death unknown
Year of birth unknown